Richard Field (2 August 1891 – 15 July 1965) was an English footballer who played for Sunderland, Dumbarton, Norwich City and  Grimsby Town.

References

1891 births
1965 deaths
English footballers
Sunderland A.F.C. players
Dumbarton F.C. players
Norwich City F.C. players
Grimsby Town F.C. players
Scottish Football League players
English Football League players
Association football midfielders